Walnut Grove is an unincorporated community in McDonough County, Illinois, United States. Walnut Grove Township was first settled in 1830. The town of Walnut Grove was "laid out" in 1870.  It was originally created on a railroad line that passed through the area, however this railroad line no longer exists.

Notable person
Kenneth G. McMillan, Illinois State Senator and educator, grew up near Walnut Grove, on a farm.

Notes

Unincorporated communities in McDonough County, Illinois
Unincorporated communities in Illinois